Charlotte A. Black Elk is a political and environmental Native American activist. She is of Oglala Lakota heritage, and is the great-granddaughter of the holy man Nicholas Black Elk. She has become well known in recent years for her role as a primary advocate for the Lakota peoples regarding the protection of the Black Hills Land Claim. She is also known for her participation in documentaries covering the history of the Lakota people, including The Way West (1995)  and The West (1996).

Early life 
Charlotte Black Elk grew up on the Pine Ridge Reservation, in the village of Manderson, which is where the Crazy Horse faction of the Lakota settled in the late 19th century. As a girl, she heard the stories of the elders and grew up with the rituals of the Lakota oral tradition. Today she speaks both English and Lakota.

Career 
In 1983, Black Elk began her involvement with the Black Hills Land Claim as secretary for the Sioux Tribal Council. Today, she acts as their legal representative.

See also
Black Elk Speaks

References

Sources 

On the Rez by Ian Frazier, page 117
http://www.imdb.com/name/nm1200653/
Time Present, Time Past by Bill Bradley
http://www.c-span.org/video/?165105-1/black-elk "Black Elk"

External links

Oglala people
South Dakota lawyers
Living people
Native American activists
20th-century American lawyers
21st-century American lawyers
Year of birth missing (living people)
20th-century American women lawyers
21st-century American women lawyers
20th-century Native American women
20th-century Native Americans
21st-century Native American women
21st-century Native Americans
Native American lawyers